Letter at Dawn is a 1948 Italian  drama film directed by Giorgio Bianchi.

In 2008 it was restored and shown as part of a retrospective "Questi fantasmi: Cinema italiano ritrovato" at the 65th Venice International Film Festival.

Cast 
Fosco Giachetti as  Carlo Marini
Jacques Sernas as  Mario Maggi
Lea Padovani as  Anna Maggi
Olga Villi as  Renata
Tatiana Pavlova as Countess Koloshky
Vittorio Sanipoli as  Enrico Verri
Franca Marzi as  Lilly 
Margherita Bagni as  Sister Maria della Carità
Nerio Bernardi as  Augusto
Paolo Ferrari as  Augusto's son
Salvo Randone as  Donati 
Ernesto Calindri as the public prosecutor

References

External links

1948 films
Italian drama films
Films directed by Giorgio Bianchi
Italian black-and-white films
1948 drama films
Films scored by Renzo Rossellini
1940s Italian films